Samuel Mark McLeod (4 January 1934 – 29 July 1973) was a Scottish professional footballer who played as a forward.

References

External links
 
 Sammy McLeod at Colchester United Archive Database

1934 births
1973 deaths
Footballers from Glasgow
Association football forwards
Scottish footballers
Colchester United F.C. players
Romford F.C. players
English Football League players